A Choga is a long sleeved robe that is worn loosely around the bodice amongst Rajasthani men.

External links
Rajasthan Blog: Choga – A Royal and Aristocratic Rajasthani Men’s Garment
Harris Museum & Art Gallery: The Textile Manufactures of India (Choga, garment)

Indian fashion
Rajasthani culture